Chinese Butterfly is a double album by keyboardist Chick Corea and drummer Steve Gadd. The band is rounded out by saxophonist/flautist Steve Wilson, guitarist Lionel Loueke and bassist Carlitos del Puerto. The album includes five new compositions and features Earth, Wind & Fire
singer Philip Bailey on a new recording of "Return to Forever" from 1972.

Reception 

In a review for AllMusic, Matt Collar wrote: "With both Corea and Gadd in their seventies at the time of recording, it's refreshing to hear them sound so inventive and willing to explore new songs, even as they look back on their over 50-year partnership. Ultimately, it's that vibrant, in-the-moment reciprocity that makes Chinese Butterfly such a compelling listen."

CJ Shearn of Jazz Views stated: "Chinese Butterfly updates a  sound from the late 70's and early 80's for a new generation.  The music doesn't rest on its laurels, instead seeking to expand... The album contains some of the strongest playing and compositions of the keyboardist in a long time and an incredibly sympathetic group that uses their strengths to imbue so much color."

Writing for Something Else!, S. Victor Aaron commented: "Chinese Butterfly breaks no new ground but in this case, that can be completely forgiven. The Chick Corea + Steve Gadd Band cover old ground with such vigor, inspiration and mastery that makes this album just as essential in 2018 as it would have been in 1978."

In an article for Jazz Times, Mac Randall remarked: "Chinese Butterfly is pretty much what you'd expect from two masters of their respective instruments: a lengthy clinic in exploratory improvisation, tight rhythmic interplay and attention-getting virtuosity."

Jazz Monthly's Scott Yanow wrote: "The sound of the band is often very much like some of Corea's freelance projects of the mid-to-late 1970s... Gadd is in a supportive role, clearly enjoying interacting with the other musicians... Always distinctive on electric piano and synthesizer... Corea is in particularly exuberant form."

Pablo Gorondi of the Daily Herald called the recording "an album full of creativity and chops," and stated: "Even after Corea and Gadd move on to other projects, Chinese Butterfly will remain as an impressive memento of their present collaboration."

WBGO's Gary Walker commented: "Any Chick Corea exploration is a fine thing. To travel with a cat with such a fine tuned rhythmic sense makes it that more enjoyable."

Chris Cooke, writing for KIOS-FM, remarked: "The long anticipated musical summit is worth listening to."

Track listing

Personnel 

Musicians
 Chick Corea – keyboards, piano
 Steve Gadd – drums
 Lionel Loueke – guitar, vocals
 Carlitos del Puerto – acoustic bass, electric bass
 Steve Wilson – flute, saxophone
 Luisito Quintero – percussion
 Philip Bailey – vocals 

Production
 Chick Corea - executive-producer
 Bill Rooney - executive-producer
 Steve Gadd - co-producer
 Bernie Grundman – engineer (mastering)
 Bernie Kirsh – engineer (mixing)
 Bob Cetti – assistant engineer

References

Collaborative albums
Jazz albums by American artists
Chick Corea albums
Concord Records albums
2017 albums